Brentwood (formerly Gunter) is an unincorporated community in Crawford Township in southeastern Washington County, Arkansas, United States. It is located on U.S. Route 71 between West Fork and Winslow. The West Fork of the White River flows past the southwest side of the community.

References

Unincorporated communities in Washington County, Arkansas
Unincorporated communities in Arkansas